Jasminum polyanthum, the many-flowered jasmine or pink jasmine, is a species of flowering plant in the olive family Oleaceae, native to China and Myanmar. A strong evergreen twining climber, it is especially noted for its abundant, highly fragrant pink to white flowers.

Name
The Latin specific epithet polyanthum means "many-flowered".

Description

The compound leaves with 5 to 9 leaflets are dark green on the upper surface and a lighter green beneath, with glabrous, terete or angular branches. The terminal leaflet is noticeably larger than the other leaflets.

Inflorescence
The species is heterostylous, meaning that a few distinct flower morphs (forms) are available, though each plant bears only one morph. In late winter and early spring it produces an abundance of reddish-pink flower buds, followed by fragrant five-petalled starry white flowers which are about 2 cm ( inch) in diameter. The bracts are subulate (tapering to a point), 1-6  mm. Each flower is carried by a pedicel (single stalk) of 0.5 - 2.5cm ( - 1 inch) The calyx forms a 1-2 mm tube terminating in 5 triangular or subulate-linear lobes, only 2 mm long, and a corolla, white, with a red underside and red buttons. The fruit is a black, globular berry.

Distribution 
The plant is native to the mountainous areas of Southwest China, particularly Guizhou, Sichuan and Yunnan, as well as Myanmar.

Cultivation
Jasminum polyanthum is well known as a house plant in the US and Europe. It grows fast and easily, and flowers well. It can also grow in the garden, when climate conditions are good; but it cannot tolerate freezing temperatures (USDA hardiness zones: 8 - 11). Outside it can be used to cover walls and fences etc., in suitable climates, in sun or light shade. It is propagated by seed and by suckers.

Jasminum polyanthum was given the Award of Garden Merit (AGM) by the RHS in 1993.   It was chosen on the Bicentenary list of 200 plants for the RHS: 
“This popular houseplant is an easily-grown, evergreen, half-hardy climber with loose panicles in summer of many strongly-fragrant pink-backed, white, trumpet-shaped flowers. It does not suffer pest or disease problems and is simple to propagate.”

Invasive species
Jasminum polyanthum is naturalized in Australia and New Zealand. It can be regarded as an invasive species in these regions. This species of jasmine spreads rapidly as it can grow from any small section of stem material. The stems layer profusely and runners spread long distances. It is highly shade tolerant and can flower under a full canopy. It forms dense ground cover, preventing the growth of native seedlings, and smothers all other vegetation up to mid-canopy level. Spread into established forest, for instance in New Zealand, is rapid.

It can be controlled by cutting the stem and branches and applying herbicides to the cut surfaces. Chemical control of ground cover is advised.

Gallery

References

External links

 Herbarium specimen
 Jasminum polyanthum at www.esveld.nl
 Weeds of Blue Mountains Bushland (Australia): Jasminum polyanthum 
 Jasminum polyanthum as a New Zealand weed
 Jasminum polyanthum in NZPCN (New Zealand Plant Conservation Network)

polyanthum
Plants described in 1891
Flora of Myanmar
Flora of China
Garden plants of Asia